Soft Lights and Sweet Music is a 1936 British musical film directed by Herbert Smith and starring Bert Ambrose, Evelyn Dall and Harry Tate. It was made by British Lion at Beaconsfield Studios. The film is a musical revue showcasing a selection of bands and variety acts of the day. It takes its title from Elisabeth Welch's popular BBC radio show, which ran from 1933–1935.

The film's art direction was by Norman G. Arnold.

Cast
 Bert Ambrose as himself - Orchestra Leader  
 Evelyn Dall as herself  
 Western Brothers as Themselves  
 Harry Tate as himself 
 Billy Bennett as himself  
 Turner Layton as himself  
 Elisabeth Welch as herself  
 Max Bacon as himself  
 Wilson, Keppel and Betty as Themselves  
 Donald Stewart as himself  
 Karina as herself  
 The Three Rhythm Brothers as Themselves  
 The Four Flash Devils as Themselves  
 The Four Robinas as Themselves  
 The Five Charladies as Themselves  
 Sandy Powell as himself 
 Dorothy Astra as herself  
 Murial Billah as herself  
 Jimmy Fletcher as himself  
 Jennie Gregson as herself  
 Bob Robinson as himself  
 Olga Zeta as herself  
 John Turnbull as Gramophone Factory Director

References

Bibliography
 Low, Rachael. Filmmaking in 1930s Britain. George Allen & Unwin, 1985.
 Wood, Linda. British Films, 1927-1939. British Film Institute, 1986.

External links

1936 films
British musical films
1936 musical films
Films shot at Beaconsfield Studios
Films set in England
Films directed by Herbert Smith
1930s English-language films
1930s British films